Octagon is a novel by Fred Saberhagen published in 1981.

Plot summary
Octagon is a novel in which Alex Barrow discovers that someone is killing his opponents in the science fiction play-by-mail game Starweb.

Reception
Greg Costikyan reviewed Octagon in Ares Magazine #11 and commented that "Octagon is a good mystery novel which explores a rather interesting theme: the idea that a clever programmer can manipulate records and programs in our computer-based world to his own ends."

Dave Langford reviewed Octagon for White Dwarf #68, and stated that "it's a pleasant thriller with the computer-moderated RPG Starweb getting uncomfortable as players are eliminated not by strategy but by assassination. I recommend this technique to Diplomacy addicts. The villain's identity is obvious long before the story reveals it, but it's all quite tense nevertheless."

Reviews
Review by Tom Easton (1982) in Analog Science Fiction/Science Fact, March 1, 1982 
Review by Tom A. Jones (1985) in Vector 127

References

1981 novels